Swettenham Pier is a pier within the city of George Town in Penang, Malaysia. Established in 1904, it is the busiest port-of-call in Malaysia for cruise shipping. The pier plays a vital role as a major entry point for tourists into Penang, aside from the Penang International Airport and land connections.

Other than cruise shipping, Swettenham Pier, located at Weld Quay, has hosted warships as well. Navy ships from several nations, including Singapore, Thailand and the United States, have berthed at the pier in the past.

History 

Towards the end of the 19th century, as maritime traffic into the Port of Penang continued to increase and railway lines in the Malay Peninsula were being built, the expansion of the Port of Penang became crucial. The construction of Swettenham Pier, undertaken by engineers Coude, Sons and Matthews, commenced in 1901. Upon its completion in 1904, the T-shaped pier provided  of wharfage.

Originally, the pier was known as the 'Iron Pier'. It was subsequently renamed Swettenham Pier, in honour of Frank Swettenham, the then Governor of the Straits Settlements.

Swettenham Pier's initial capacity proved insufficient.

Between 1942 and 1944, at the height of World War II, the pier was used as a submarine base by the Japanese, German and Italian navies.

Up until the late 1960s, steamers and other cargo vessels with a draft of up to  used to dock at Swettenham Pier. The pier's heyday was abruptly ended, however, with the revocation of George Town's free port status by the Malaysian federal government in 1969.

In the early 2000s, Swettenham Pier was upgraded into a cruise shipping terminal. The Swettenham Pier Cruise Terminal, with a new three-storey building and an aerobridge, was completed in 2009. George Town's cruise tourism industry has been booming ever since, with Swettenham Pier soon attracting cruise ships of increasing size, such as the RMS Queen Mary 2. In 2017, Swettenham Pier overtook Port Klang as the busiest cruise shipping harbour in Malaysia.

Plans have also been drawn up for the expansion of Swettenham Pier in the near future to accommodate larger cruise ships.

Operational statistics

See also 
 Port of Penang
 George Town Ferry Terminal
 Weld Quay

References

External links 
 Swettenham Pier Cruise Terminal

Ports and harbours of Malaysia
Ports and harbours of the Indian Ocean
Buildings and structures in George Town, Penang
Transport in Penang